Smelt Bay Provincial Park is a provincial park in British Columbia, Canada. It is located at the south end of Cortes Island, and has twenty-two camping sites. Eight are reservable and the rest are first-come, first-served. There is also an overflow parking lot directly next to the beach for any excess campers.

References

Provincial parks of British Columbia
Cortes Island
Protected areas established in 1973
1973 establishments in British Columbia